Monolopia is a genus of flowering plants in the family Asteraceae.

The entire genus is endemic to California.

 Species
 Monolopia congdonii (syn. Lembertia congdonii) — San Joaquin woollythread - from Fresno Co to Santa Barbara Co
 Monolopia gracilens — woodland monolopia - from Contra Costa Co to San Luis Obispo Co
 Monolopia lanceolata — common monolopia - from Contra Costa + San Joaquin Cos to San Diego + Riverside Cos. 
 Monolopia major — cupped monolopia - from Tehama Co to Ventura Co
 Monolopia stricta - Crum's monolopia - from Monterey + Merced Cos to Kern Co

References

External links

Asteraceae genera
Endemic flora of California
Natural history of the California chaparral and woodlands
Madieae